Filip Bednarek (born 26 September 1992) is a Polish professional footballer who plays as a goalkeeper for  Ekstraklasa side Lech Poznań.

Club career
Bednarek signed with Dutch side FC Twente at the age of 16. He made his debut for FC Twente on 6 December 2012 against Helsingborgs IF in UEFA Europa League. As he never could make it to the first eleven, he left Twente as a free agent in July 2015. After being on trial with FC Utrecht, he signed a one-year contract with the club, including an option for an extra season.

He returned to Poland on 5 June 2020, signing a two-year deal plus a one-year option with Ekstraklasa side Lech Poznań. With Lech's then-captain Mickey van der Hart out with injury, Bednarek was Lech's first-choice goalkeeper throughout the first half of the season, including their entire Europa League campaign.

Career statistics

1 Including UEFA Europa League.
2 Including Promotion/relegation play-offs.
3 Including Polish Super Cup.

Personal life
He is the older brother of Southampton defender Jan Bednarek.

Honours
Lech Poznań
 Ekstraklasa: 2021–22

References

External links
 
 Voetbal International profile 
 

1992 births
Living people
People from Słupca County
Sportspeople from Greater Poland Voivodeship
Association football goalkeepers
Polish footballers
Polish expatriate footballers
Poland youth international footballers
Poland under-21 international footballers
FC Twente players
FC Utrecht players
De Graafschap players
SC Heerenveen players 
Lech Poznań players
Lech Poznań II players
Eredivisie players
Eerste Divisie players
Ekstraklasa players
II liga players
Expatriate footballers in the Netherlands
Jong FC Twente players